Tea Marinović (born 22 October 1999) is a Montenegrin handball player for Chambray Touraine Handball and the Montenegrin national team.

She was selected as part of the Montenegrin 35-player squad for the 2020 European Women's Handball Championship.

Achievements 
Montenegrin Championship:
Winner: 2018
Montenegrin Cup:
Winner: 2018

References

1999 births
Living people
Montenegrin female handball players
Sportspeople from Podgorica
Expatriate handball players
Montenegrin expatriate sportspeople in France
Competitors at the 2018 Mediterranean Games
Mediterranean Games silver medalists for Montenegro
Mediterranean Games medalists in handball